This is a list of neighborhoods in the Israeli city of Netanya.

 Ben Zion
 Ein Hatchelet
 Galy Hayam
 Gan Bracha
 Givat Hairusim
 Ir Yamim
 Kiryat Eliezer
 Kiryat Hasharon
 Kiryat Nordau
 Kiryat Oved 
 Kiryat Sanz
 Kiryat Rabin (Amalia)
 Mahane Ya’akov
 Mishkenot Zvuloon
 Neot Begin
 Neot Ganim (Shikun Vatikim)
 Neot Golda 
 Neot Herzl
 Neot Shaked (Azorim)
 Neve Itamar
 Neve Oz 
 Nof Hatayelet (NT/600 North)
 Pardes Hagdud
 Ramat Efraim
 Ramat Hen
 Ramat Poleg 
 Ramat Yadin (Dora)
 Sela
 Sapir Industrial Park
 Tubruk
 Umm Khalid (ruined)

he:נתניה#שכונות